Yukuk Shad (r. 638–642, died 653) reigned in the final days of the Western Turkic Khaganate. His name Yukuk means "owl", according to Gumilyov, or means "venerable", according to Gabain. His full title was 乙毗咄陆可汗 or Yipi Duolu Kehan (Zuev's reconstructed Old Turkic: *Yelbi Turuk Qaghan).

Early days 

He was the son of Illig Qaghan, ruler of the Eastern Turkic Khaganate and spent his early years there. In 627, he was assigned to suppress a rebellion around Tien shan but was defeated and fled.

Invitation from the West 

After the death of Tong of the Western Turkic Khanate in 628, the central authority of the khagans among the West Turks was challenged by the leaders of the ten tribes collectively known as Onok. However, there was also a competition between the two wings of Onok; i.e., the Dulu and the Nushibi factions. Ishbara Tolis who became the khagan in 634 tried to increase his authority by the support of Nushibi. But his camp was raided and he had to escape to Fergana (in modern Uzbekistan). But even after his escape, the leaders of the ten tribes preferred a khagan from the Ashina house to maintain the delicate balance between the two wings. Yukuk's name was proposed by a certain Tun Tudun. Yukuk whose father's territory had long been lost readily accepted the invitation. But it soon turned out that although he was welcome by Dulu, Nushibi tribes opposed him.

Yukuk as a khagan 

After a civil war between the two wings of the Onok, Ili River became the border line between the Nushibi (the south of he river) and the Tulo (north of the river ) by the Ili river treaty in 638. Yukuk assumed the title Ilig Beg Tughluk Khagan  and became the khagan of the north side. By 641, Yukuk  consolidated most  tribes between the Ili River and Siberia (including those not a part of Onok group) under his rule. In 642 he raided Samarkand (in modern Uzbekistan) one of the wealthiest cities of the silk road. But the distribution of loot between the tribes caused problems, and he lost the support of Tulo tribes. Nushibi tribes, supported by Tang China, saw this as a chance to overthrow Yukuk. They elected Irbis Seguy (Ilig Beg Shekuei Qaghan) as they khagan. This election meant the end of Onok union. Initially they attacked Yukuk and forced him to escape to Isfijab (Sayram in modern Kazakhstan). They further laid a siege on Istijab . But although Yukuk got no help from Tulo tribes he managed to defeat them. After this victory, Yukuk tried to regain Tulo support. But Tulo leaders rejected his proposal. Yukuk, feeling insecure without tribal support, escaped to Kunduz (in modern Afghanistan) in 642.

He then conquered Tuhuoluo (吐火羅; i.e. Bactrian-speaking Tokharoi or Tocharians) and attacked Yiwu in 642, which had by now been converted into Tang's Yi Prefecture (伊州), although his attacks were repelled by the Tang general Guo Xiaoke (郭孝恪).

In 642, he began to suffer dissent within, as he was said to have hoarded the spoils from attacks on the Sogdian states of Kangju (康居) and Maymurgh (米 Mǐ; on the Amu Darya near today Panjakent) and refused to divide them with his subordinates, and when one of his generals, Ashina Nishou (阿史那泥熟) nevertheless seized some, Ashina Yugu executed him, causing Ashina Nishou's subordinate Huluwu (胡祿屋) to rebel. The rebels sought aid from Tang, and Emperor Taizong created El Kulug Shad's son as Irbis Sheguy khagan. Yukuk initially prevailed in battle against Yipishekui Khan, but the rebels refused to submit despite the defeats, and Yukuk eventually withdrew and took up position in former Tuhuoluo territory.

Later years 
New khagan initially attacked Yukuk and forced him to escape to Isfijab (Sayram in modern Kazakhstan). They further laid a siege on Isfijab . But although Yukuk got no help from Tulu tribes he managed to defeat them. After this victory, Yukuk tried to regain Tulu support. But Tulo leaders rejected his proposal. Yukuk, feeling insecure without tribal support, escaped to Kunduz (in modern Afghanistan) in 642. He spent the rest of his life in Kunduz and died in 653. His heir was Zhenzhu Yabgu, who was one of the last representatives of the family. But his authority was limited to a single city.

References

653 deaths
Göktürk khagans
Ashina house of the Turkic Empire
7th-century Turkic people
Year of birth unknown